Frederick Hiroshi Katayama (born February 18, 1960) is a Japanese American television journalist, currently working as a news anchor for Reuters Television. He currently serves on the board of directors for the Japan Society and the U.S.-Japan Council.

He graduated from Columbia College in 1982 with a Bachelor of Arts degree in East Asian studies, earning magna cum laude distinctions. He went on to the Columbia University Graduate School of Journalism and earned a Master of Science degree with a concentration in business reporting.

He has won numerous awards for his work in print, television and video journalism. He has won the National Journalism Award several times from the Asian American Journalists Association: in 2013 for his report on the science behind the knuckleball, in 1993 for his humorous report on a family of executives competing in the food industry, and in 1997, an honorable mention for his special report on the Asian American campaign financing scandal. He also was decorated with AAJA's ELP Outstanding Award for Leadership in 2004. In 2007, the show he anchored, Reuters Technology Week, was a Webby Award honoree. He received an honorable mention in 1997 from the Asian American Journalists Association for his special report on the Asian American campaign financing scandal. In April 2000, Katayama's report on broadband technology was cited when Moneyline won a Maxwell Media Award. In spring 2016, he along with Senator Daniel Inouye and U.S.-Japan Council president Irene Hirano was featured in the Japanese Overseas Migration Museum's exhibition on successful people worldwide with roots in Japan's Fukuoka prefecture.

Katayama was one of five writers including former Senate Majority Leader and U.S. Ambassador Mike Mansfield who penned the book, Japan: A Living Portrait, published in 1994.

Personal life
On May 3, 1998, Katayama married Kaoriko Kuge, a Japanese news journalist, at the St. Paul's Chapel (Columbia University).

Katayama was born in Los Angeles and raised in Monterey Park, California to parents Hideo, owner of Pasadena's Jensen Printing Company, and June C. Katayama, a Japanese calligraphy teacher.

References

1960 births
Living people
Journalists from California
Journalists from New York City
American male journalists
American journalists of Asian descent
American television journalists
American writers of Japanese descent
People from Montebello, California
Columbia University Graduate School of Journalism alumni
Reuters people
Columbia College (New York) alumni